The 1992 season was São Paulo's 63rd season since club's existence.

Statistics

Scorers

Managers performance

Overall

{|class="wikitable"
|-
|Games played || 84 (25 Campeonato Brasileiro, 14 Copa Libertadores, 34 Campeonato Paulista, 4 Supercopa Sudamericana, 1 Intercontinental Cup, 6 Friendly match)
|-
|Games won || 45 (10 Campeonato Brasileiro, 8 Copa Libertadores, 21 Campeonato Paulista, 1 Supercopa Sudamericana, 1 Intercontinental Cup, 4 Friendly match)
|-
|Games drawn || 21 (7 Campeonato Brasileiro, 3 Copa Libertadores, 9 Campeonato Paulista, 1 Supercopa Sudamericana, 0 Intercontinental Cup, 1 Friendly match)
|-
|Games lost || 18 (8 Campeonato Brasileiro, 3 Copa Libertadores, 4 Campeonato Paulista, 2 Supercopa Sudamericana, 0 Intercontinental Cup, 1 Friendly match)
|-
|Goals scored || 133
|-
|Goals conceded || 73
|-
|Goal difference || +60
|-
|Best result || 6–0 (H) v Noroeste - Campeonato Paulista - 1992.10.15
|-
|Worst result || 0–4 (H) v Palmeiras - Campeonato Brasileiro - 1992.03.08
|-
|Top scorer || Raí (31)
|-

Friendlies

Trofeo Teresa Herrera

Trofeo Ramón de Carranza

Trofeo Ciudad de Barcelona

Trofeo Villa de Madrid

Official competitions

Campeonato Brasileiro

League table

Matches

Second stage

Matches

Record

Copa Libertadores

First stage

Eightfinals

Quarterfinals

Semifinals

Finals

Record

Campeonato Paulista

League table

Matches

Second phase

Matches

Finals

Record

Supercopa Sudamericana

Record

Intercontinental Cup

Record

External links
official website 

Sao Paulo
São Paulo FC seasons